Hypanis is a genus of bivalves belonging to the family Cardiidae.

The species of this genus are found at Black Sea.

Species:

Hypanis andrussowi 
Hypanis dolosmiana 
Hypanis plicata

References

Cardiidae
Bivalve genera